Central Water Commission (CWC) is a technical organisation that functions as part of the Ministry of Jal Shakti in the Government of India. They are entrusted with the responsibilities of providing consultation to various state governments on water bodies related issues, coordinate various governmental schemes for conservation, control, and utilisation of water resources. 

Central Water Commission help state governments in devising and analysing flood control measures. They undertake flash flood forecast as well. Their professional assistance is received by the government for various irrigation and drinking water supply projects. Water Power Development is another area where central water commission undertakes the tasks of investigations, construction and executions. The Chairman of the Central Water Commission has the  status of Ex-Officio Secretary to the Government of India.

Currently, Chandrashekhar Iyer is the Chairman of Central Water Commission.

The three Wings of Central Water Commission are Designs and Research (D&R), River Management (RM) Wing, and Water Planning and Projects (WP&P) Wing. Each of these wings is a responsibility of a full-time Member with the status of Ex-Officio Additional Secretary to the Government of India. These wings comprises a number of organizations responsible for the disposal of assigned tasks and duties.

References 

Ministry of Water Resources (India)